A summer camp is a supervised program for children or teenagers conducted during the summer months.

Summer camp may also refer to:
 Summer Camp Music Festival, a music festival 
 Summercamp, an American band
 Summer Camp (band), a British indie pop duo
 Summer Camp (film), a film by Alberto Marini
 Summer Camp (TV series), a reality show that aired on USA Network

See also 
 Summer Camping, a Canadian television series
 Camp (disambiguation)